The Wuxi Mosque is a mosque in Liangxi District, Wuxi City, Jiangsu Province, China.

History
The mosque was originally constructed in 1921. In 1999, the mosque was reconstructed to its current shape of the building.

Architecture
The mosque was constructed with Arabic architectural style. It spans over an area of 2,182 m2.

Transportation
The mosque is accessible within walking distance west of Nanchan Temple Station of Wuxi Metro.

See also
 Islam in China
 List of mosques in China

References

1921 establishments in China
Buildings and structures in Wuxi
Mosques completed in 1999
Mosques in China
Religious buildings and structures in Jiangsu